Peter Armstrong (1936–2019) was an Australian professional rugby league footballer who played in the 1950s and 1960s.

Playing career
Armstrong was a hooker with the St. George Dragons who played eight seasons with the club between 1957-1964.

He came into the first grade side when Ken Kearney suffered his career ending injury in 1961. Armstrong became a dual premiership winning player with the St. George Dragons, winning the premiership with them in the 1961 Grand Final and the 1964 Grand Final while deputizing for the injured Ian Walsh.

He finished his career at Newtown in 1965.

Death
Armstrong died on 7 April 2019 at Tweed Heads, New South Wales.

References

1936 births
2019 deaths
St. George Dragons players
Newtown Jets players
Australian rugby league players
Rugby league hookers
Place of birth missing
Rugby league players from Sydney